Robinson Road may refer to

Robinson Road, Hong Kong
Robinson Road, London, The United Kingdom
Robinson Road, Brisbane, Australia 
Robinson Road, India
Robinson Road (Mississippi), a historical road in the US state of Mississippi
Robinson Road, Singapore
Former name of Nathan Road in Hong Kong

Road disambiguation pages